Zoran Spišljak (born 12 January 1965) is a Serbian football manager.

Managerial career
On 10 August 2011, Spišljak became the head coach of the Nemzeti Bajnokság I club Újpest FC.

Spišljak became the coach of the Nemzeti Bajnokság II club Békéscsaba 1912 Előre SE in the summer of 2014.

References

1965 births
Living people
Serbian football managers
Cardiff City F.C. non-playing staff
Barnet F.C. non-playing staff
Újpest FC managers
Zalaegerszegi TE managers
Békéscsaba 1912 Előre managers
Nyíregyháza Spartacus FC managers
Nemzeti Bajnokság I managers

Serbian expatriate football managers
Expatriate football managers in the United Kingdom
Serbian expatriate sportspeople in the United Kingdom
Expatriate football managers in Hungary
Serbian expatriate sportspeople in Hungary